Oxygen-regulated protein 1 also known as retinitis pigmentosa 1 protein (RP1) is a protein that in humans is encoded by the RP1 gene.

Function 
This gene encodes a member of the doublecortin family. The protein encoded by this gene contains two doublecortin domains that bind to microtubules and regulate microtubule polymerization. The encoded protein is a protein associated with the photoreceptor cell microtubules in the retina and is necessary for the correct stacking of outer segment disc. This protein and another retinal-specific protein, RP1L1, play essential and synergistic roles in affecting photosensitivity and outer segment morphogenesis of rod photoreceptor cells.

History 
Initially named "ORP1" for its response to in vivo retinal oxygen levels (designated ORP1 for 'oxygen-regulated protein-1'), this gene was subsequently linked to autosomal dominant retinitis pigmentosa and was renamed RP1 for 'retinitis pigmentosa 1'.

Clinical significance 
Mutations in this gene cause autosomal dominant or autosomal recessive retinitis pigmentosa. Transcript variants produced by alternative promoters and alternative splicing have been discovered that overlap with the current reference sequence and have multiple exons upstream and downstream of the current reference sequence. However, as of 2010, it is currently impossible to determine the biological effectiveness and full-length nature of certain variants.

See also
 Disc shedding

References

Further reading

External links
  GeneReviews/NIH/NCBI/UW entry on Retinitis Pigmentosa Overview